Richard or Rick Barry may refer to:

Politicians and nobility
 Richard Barry (Irish politician) (1919–2013), Irish Fine Gael politician
 Richard Barry, 2nd Earl of Barrymore (1630–1694)
 Richard Barry, 7th Earl of Barrymore (1769–1793), English nobleman of Ireland
 Richard Barry (died 1787), British Member of Parliament for Wigan
 Richard Barrey (died 1588), British Member of Parliament for Winchelsea

Others
 Richard Hugh Barry (1908–1999), British Army officer
 Richard Barry, an American businessman, founder of Tru Kids, Inc
 Rick Barry (born 1944), American basketball player
 Rich Barry (born 1940), American baseball player
 Scooter Barry (born 1966),American basketball player

See also
Dick Barry, American lawyer and politician
Richard Berry (disambiguation)